Robert Wallis may refer to:

Robert Wallis (engraver) (1794–1878), English engraver
Robert Wallis (footballer) (1904–?), English footballer
Robert Wallis (politician), English politician, House of Commons 1597—1611
Bob Wallis (1934–1991), jazz musician

See also
Robert Wallace (disambiguation)
Robert Waleys, MP for Ipswich
Wallis (surname)